Vanetti is a surname native to the North Italy.

Italian-language surnames